Nicole Trimmel (born October 13, 1982), is  an Austrian kickboxer. She is a multiple World Champion and European Champion in Kickboxing. Since 2004 she holds the title of Austrian Champion in Kickboxing for each year. In 2004 and 2005 she was awarded Burgenland’s Sportswoman of the Year. The following year, Trimmel received an Order of Merit by the Republic of Austria and by the Federal State Burgenland respectively.

Early life and education
Nicole Trimmel was born in Vienna, Austria to Anita and Walter Trimmel. Her brother is Roland Trimmel. Having spent the early years of her life in Vienna the family decided to move back to Oslip, the parent’s hometown, in 1986.

The fascination of martial arts took Nicole Trimmel already when being a small child. However, the path to kickboxing included a number of other sports, such as athletics and women’s soccer, in which all of them she was successful. Only in 1997, when being in secondary school, she made her first experience in martial arts during a self-defence course. Enthusiasm aroused quickly, but it took until 1999 till Nicole Trimmel started her kickboxing career at KBC Rust.

Career

Early career (1999–2003)
At KBC Rust coach Joachim Huber immediately recognised the talent of Nicole Trimmel for kickboxing. Thoroughly preparing her for the first national championship, she won the Austrian Youth Champion title on first attempt. Further achievements on national level followed.
Consequently, in 2002 she was called up to join the Austrian national team for kickboxing. The same year she started at the IAKSA World Championships in Kickboxing in Caorle, Italy. The fight for entry into the final was accompanied by nervousness - she lost, eventually.
In 2003 Trimmel changed to ASVÖ KBC Rohrbach, but remained loyal to coach Joachim Huber.

Breakthrough (2003–2004)
The breakthrough came 2003 at the IAKSA World Championships in Kickboxing in Miami, Florida, U.S. As an underdog, she managed to score two Vice-World Champion titles in juniors- and general class. Again, a number of titles at national as well as international tournaments followed.

Critical success (2004–present)
The critical success came 2004 at the IAKSA / WKA World Championships in Kickboxing in Basel, Switzerland.  Nicole Trimmel made it straight to the final, where she went for World Champion in Kickboxing in discipline light contact. In addition, at the same event she scored twice as Vice-World Champion in Kickboxing in disciplines semi contact and team respectively.
Ever since Trimmel has shown a strong performance at national as well as international kickboxing tournaments: in 2005 she became three-time World Champion in Kickboxing at the IAKSA World Championships in Moscow, Russia – disciplines included team, hard- and semi contact. In 2006 only the WAKO European Championships in Kickboxing took place in Lisbon, Portugal, where she made it to Vice-European Champion in Kickboxing in discipline full contact. In 2007, she managed to become twice Vice-World Champion in Kickboxing in full- and light contact respectively. Since 2004 Nicole Trimmel has managed to become Austrian Champion in Kickboxing for each year correspondingly.
She has remained on top of the podium ever since, scoring gold and silver medals in the years following. As such, she currently holds the top spot in WAKO Pro-competitions - the highest professional level achievable in kickboxing - on a national and international level. This was further rounded off by becoming European Champion in 2010 - a first for Nicole Trimmel.

A complex knee injury kept her from competing in most competitions in 2011, however immediately after recovery she stepped to the top once more in becoming the World Champion in Kickboxing at the WAKO Kickboxing Championships in Skopje, Macedonia. That was followed some weeks later by another World Championship title in full-contact in Dublin, Ireland.

These achievements were acknowledged by the vote for Burgenland’s Sportswoman of the Year in 2004 and 2005. In 2006 Trimmel received the Silver Order of Merit of the Republic of Austria, which was followed by the Golden Order of Merit of Federal State Burgenland – both, for her achievements in sports and for representing the country internationally.
In a survey for ‘The Top 100 VIPs of Burgenland’ by the Austrian magazine News readers voted her on place 19 in February 2007.

Personal life

Charitable work
Nicole Trimmel recently uses her popularity more publicly noticed to participate in charitable work targeted at children and youths. In 2007, she contributed as guest instructor to the Spark7 Slam Tour, an initiative to foster youths for (sports) exercise.
Besides, Trimmel is developing a concept to bring the issues regarding climate change and environmental protection closer to people, in particular to children and youth.

Achievements

Awards
 Golden Order of Merit of Federal State Burgenland
 Silver Order of Merit of the Republic of Austria
 Burgenland’s Sportswoman of the Year 2005
 Burgenland’s Sportswoman of the Year 2004

See also
 Kickboxing
 Martial arts
 List of Austrians
 List of female kickboxers

References

External links

 Nicole Trimmel - Official website
 Nicole Trimmel - Video of Nicole Trimmel at Austrian Classics, Wörgl
 Sportpool Burgenland - Directory of athletes
 WAKO - World Association of Kickboxing Organizations
 WKA - World Kickboxing Association

Austrian female kickboxers
Sportspeople from Vienna
1982 births
Living people